The forty-fifth edition of the Caribbean Series (Serie del Caribe) was held from February 2 through February 8 of  at Roberto Clemente Stadium in Carolina, Puerto Rico. It featured the champion baseball teams of the Dominican Republic, Águilas Cibaeñas; Mexico, Cañeros de Los Mochis, and Puerto Rico, Indios de Mayagüez. This time Venezuela did not participate in the tournament due to a national general strike, being replaced by the second place team from Puerto Rico, the Criollos de Caguas. The format consisted of 12 games, each team facing the other teams twice.

Summary

Final standings

Individual leaders

All-Star team

Sources
Bjarkman, Peter. Diamonds around the Globe: The Encyclopedia of International Baseball. Greenwood. 
Serie del Caribe 2003
Serie del Caribe : History, Records and Statistics (Spanish)

Caribbean
2004
International baseball competitions hosted by Puerto Rico
2003 in Caribbean sport
2003 in Puerto Rican sports
Caribbean Series